Ascesis is a genus of click beetles in the subfamily Dendrometrinae. Species are found in Australia.

References 

Elateridae genera
Dendrometrinae